Mardy Fish was the defending champion, but decided to participate in the Davis Cup instead.

No. 1 seed John Isner won the tournament, beating Belgian Olivier Rochus in the final, 6–3, 7–6(8–6).  In doing so, Isner became the first top seed to ever win the tournament, breaking the "Casino Curse."

Seeds

Qualifying

Draw

Finals

Top half

Bottom half

References

 Main Draw
 Qualifying Draw

Campbell's Hall of Fame Tennis Championships - Singles